Clique is a British thriller television series created by Jess Brittain, starring Synnøve Karlsen and Rachel Hurd-Wood. It was released as part of BBC Three's online-only schedule and later aired on BBC One. Series 1 premiered on 5 March 2017 and concluded on 9 April 2017. A second six-part series was ordered in January 2018. It premiered in November 2018 on BBC Three Online.

Plot

Series 1
Childhood friends Georgia and Holly are only a few weeks into the so-called best years of their lives at university in Edinburgh, when Georgia gets drawn into an elite clique of alpha girls (Fay, Phoebe, Louise, and Rachel) led by lecturer Jude McDermid. Jude's brand of feminism is alluring, just like the circle of bright students she surrounds herself with. Georgia's effortless entry into the clique leaves Holly out in the cold. However, this soon escalates to panic as Georgia begins acting erratically. Alarmed by this transformation in her best friend, Holly is compelled to follow her into Jude's closely guarded circle. What she discovers is a seductive world of lavish parties, populated by Edinburgh's highest-powered business men and women. But it's a world underpinned by sordid compromise, and as Holly exposes its deeply corrupt core, the danger mounts from all angles, for her and Georgia. Holly's own dark past also threatens to resurface.

Series 2
A year after the events of Season 1, Holly is now in her second year of university and living in a house share with Louise and student activists Rayna and Fraser. Holly's exposé of Solasta Finance has led to intense fascination from everyone around her. She encounters a close-knit group of young men, led by charismatic Jack Yorke and finds herself becoming immersed in a campus-wide scandal. Meanwhile, from within a secure unit, Rachel keeps obsessing over Holly.

Cast and characters

Main
 Synnøve Karlsen as Holly McStay, a highly perceptive and self-assured student at Edinburgh with a dark past.
 Orla Bayne as young Holly
 Rachel Hurd-Wood as Rachel Maddox, an expert at reading people who shares an affinity with Holly.
 Grace Greatorex-Watson as young Rachel

Supporting
 Sophia Brown as Louise "Lou" Taggart (series 1–2), an intelligent and hardworking student from London who is pragmatic about her lack of people skills.
Ella-Rae Smith as Phoebe Parker-Fox (series 1, guest series 2), a minor aristocrat whose networking skills make up for her lack of financial knowledge.

Series 1
 Aisling Franciosi as Georgia Cunningham, a cheerful and optimistic 19-year-old girl, who is Holly's best friend and joins the Solasta Women's Initiative, working in the Client Relations Department of Solasta Finance.
 Evie Brassington as young Georgia
 Emma Appleton as Fay Brookstone, the first member of Jude's clique, and not quite as happy in it as her peers. She works in the Client Accounts Department of Solasta Finance.
 Louise Brealey as Jude McDermid, an Economics professor and philosopher and co-founder of the Solasta Women's Initiative.
 Emun Elliott as Alistair McDermid, CEO of Solasta Finance, an Edinburgh-based private bank, and co-founder of the Solasta Women's Initiative, which fast-tracks bright women into finance through coveted internships at his bank. He is Jude's older brother.
 Mark Strepan as Rory Sawyer, a banker at Solasta Finance who has a relationship with Holly.
 Jack Bannon as James Buxton, a banker at Solasta Finance, close with Rory and was in a relationship with Fay.
 Chris Fulton as Charlie Lamont-Smith, a banker at Solasta Finance, in a relationship with Phoebe.
 Harris Dickinson as Sam, a musician whom Holly has a brief relationship with.
 Sorcha Groundsell as Elizabeth Smith, an intelligent and observant university student who idolizes the clique and aims to join the Solasta Women's Initiative. She befriends Holly and helps her to uncover the truth.
 Peter Bankole as Mo, a Somali illegal immigrant and a driver for the clique.
 Kåre Conradi as Lukas Steiner, a powerful businessman who works with Alistair and recruits from the Solasta Women's Initiative.

Series 2
 Leo Suter as Jack Yorke, the charismatic leader of a clique of boys.
 Nicholas Nunn as Calum McGowan, a member of Jack's clique and his foster brother.
 Barney Harris as Barney Bowen, a member of Jack's clique.
 Jyuddah Jaymes as Aubrey Richardson, a gay American student and a member of Jack's clique.
 Imogen King as Rayna, a friendly housemate of Holly who looks up to her.
 Stuart Campbell as Fraser, a housemate of Holly who likes Rayna.
 Izuka Hoyle as Dani, Lou's new girlfriend who works at Agnes Reid's office.
 Madeleine Worrall as Agnes Reid, an MSP and Jack's mother who is running to become an MP.
 Richard Gadd as Ben Howard, creator of Twitcher, an alternative media website.
 David Robb as Dean Wentworth, the head of the university.
 Faye Castelow as Hettie, Rachel's psychotherapist.
 Fraser Saunders as Jamie, a troubled youth.
 Michael Nardone as Alec McStay, Holly's father.

Episodes

Series 1 (2017)

Series 2 (2018)

Broadcast and release
Clique first aired on BBC Three week-by-week for its six-episode run in from 5 March to 9 April 2017. It then aired on BBC One from 20 May to 3 June 2017. As of 2018 Clique is broadcast in the United States on Pop; in Spain it is broadcast on HBO; in Greece by State ERT; and in Germany on ARD's channel one.

Home media
On 8 May 2017, the first series of Clique was released on DVD.

References

External links 
 
 

2017 British television series debuts
2018 British television series endings
2010s British drama television series
BBC high definition shows
BBC television dramas
British thriller television series
English-language television shows
Suicide in television
Television series by All3Media
Television shows set in Edinburgh
Television series by BBC Studios